The Embassy of the Republic of China (Taiwan) to the Holy See is the diplomatic mission of the Republic of China (as known as Taiwan) accredited to the Holy See, one of its few de jure embassies in the world, and the only one remaining in Europe. It also has responsibility for relations with the Sovereign Military Order of Malta.

Its counterpart in the Republic of China is the Apostolic Nunciature to China in Taipei.

It is separate from the Taipei Representative Office in Italy in Rome, which functions as a de facto embassy in Italy.

History
The Republic of China established relations with the Holy See in July 1942. After Xie Shoukang arrived in Rome on 26 January 1943, the legation was based in the Vatican City. After the Second World War, the legation was moved to Rome. In June 1959, the Republic of China Legation was upgraded to an Embassy, and the Minister Plenipotentiary became Ambassador.  

In March 2005, the embassy was moved to Via della Conciliazione 4/D.

List of Envoys to the Holy See

List of Ambassadors to the Holy See

See also
 Holy See–Taiwan relations
 List of diplomatic missions of the Republic of China

References

Taiwan (ROC)
Holy See